Acacia rubida, commonly known as red stem wattle, red stemmed wattle or red leaved wattle, is a shrub belonging to the genus Acacia and the subgenus Phyllodineae that is native to parts of eastern Australia.

Description
The juvenile foliage is pinnate and can persist on older plants. It blooms between July and November producing inflorescences with pale to bright yellow flowers.

Taxonomy
The species was first formally described by the botanist Allan Cunningham in 1825 in the work On the Botany of the Blue Mountains. Geographical Memoirs on New South Wales. The only synonym is Racosperma rubidum. It is also often confused with Acacia amoena

Distribution
It is found in southwestern parts of Queensland, western New South Wales and Victoria on the tablelands of the Great Dividing Range. It is often a part of open woodland or dry sclerophyll forest communities and grows on rocky hilltops and slopes in rocky soils and in alluvial soils along rivers and creeks. The bulk of the population is found between the Black Range in northeast Victoria in the south up to near Stanthorpe in south-eastern Queensland.

Cultivation
The shrub is sold commercially in tubestock or in seed form. It is noted as a good pioneer species being fast-growing, hardy, cold tolerant and beneficial as a nitrogen fixing plant. It can grow nutrient-poor, shallow, skeletal, high altitude soils and plays a valuable role in catchment protection within its native range. It prefers a sunny position, requires little maintenance, is drought tolerant and can tolerate temporary inundations.

See also
 List of Acacia species

References

rubida
Flora of New South Wales
Flora of Queensland
Flora of Victoria (Australia)
Plants described in 1825
Taxa named by Allan Cunningham (botanist)